Alban Sabah (born 22 June 1992) is a Togolese association footballer who plays as a centre-back for German 4th division club FSV Frankfurt. He also holds German citizenship.

Career
Sabah was born in Kpalime. He made his senior debut for Schalke 04 when he traveled to Israel for the clubs Europa League clash against Israeli Premier League team Maccabi Haifa in which Schalke ran out 3–1 winners.

References

External links

1992 births
Living people
People from Kpalimé
Togolese footballers
German footballers
Germany youth international footballers
Togo international footballers
Association football defenders
FC Schalke 04 II players
Dynamo Dresden players
Dynamo Dresden II players
SV Waldhof Mannheim players
SSVg Velbert players
Sportfreunde Siegen players
FSV Frankfurt players
2. Bundesliga players
3. Liga players
Togolese expatriate footballers
Togolese expatriate sportspeople in Germany
Expatriate footballers in Germany
21st-century Togolese people